Parahuna is an Indian Punjabi language comedy film directed by Amrit Raj Chadha and Mohit Banwait. The film stars Kulwinder Billa and Wamiqa Gabbi in lead roles while Karamjit Anmol, Harby Sangha, Sardar Sohi, Hobby Dhaliwal, Malkit Rouni and many others in the supporting roles. The film was released on 28 September 2018.

Plot

Janta is obsessed with the 1980s Punjabi film actress Preeti Sapru and he dreams of marrying a woman who looks just like his screen idol. A friend in the village tells Janta that his sister-in-law bears an uncanny resemblance to Preeti Sapru. Emboldened by this exciting news, Janta accompanies his friend to a wedding where he intends to woo the beautiful doppelganger. In his pursuit of a seemingly perfect woman, Janta helps others to solve their romantic woes.

Cast

 Kulwinder Billa as Janta
 Wamiqa Gabbi as Maano
 Karamjit Anmol
 Harby Sangha
 Sardar Sohi
 Hobby Dhaliwal
 Anita Meet
 Malkit Rouni
 Nirmal Rishi
 Rupinder Rupi
 Gurpreet Bhangu
 Parkash Gadu
 Raj Dhaliwal
 Akshita
 Navdeep Kaler
 Tarsem Paul
 Aman Sidhu

Reception
The film opened good as shows of the film remained top at different sites.

The film received fair reviews from critic reviewers. Jasmine Singh of The Tribune gave just 1 star to the film out of 5. The reviewer criticised the film, saying, "Anything in excess is not good. Even love overdose can be lethal! And overdose of tradition and culture on Punjabi cinema leads to a film, Parahuna, which is this week's Punjabi film release."

References

External links
 

Punjabi-language Indian films
2010s Punjabi-language films
Indian comedy films